Mycoplana is a genus of Gram-negative bacteria. The cells are slightly curved or irregularly shaped rods. Initially, the cells can form filaments, which can also be branched. After some time, the filaments break up into irregular rods. Mycoplana is motile by peritrichous flagella.

Etymology 
The genus name Mycoplana consists of two words, mykos ("mushroom") and planos ("wandering"). It refers to the mobility and the similarity with fungi (the genus produces filaments like fungi).

References 

Rhizobiaceae
Bacteria genera